The Telephone may refer to:

 The Telephone (opera), a 1947 English-language comic opera by Gian Carlo Menotti
 The Telephone (1910 film), an American silent black and white drama film
 The Telephone (1956 film), an Australian television play
 The Telephone (1988 film), a comedy-drama film starring Whoopi Goldberg

See also
 Telephone (disambiguation)